A bicycle bell is a percussive signaling instrument mounted on a bicycle for warning pedestrians and other cyclists. The bell is a required piece of equipment in some jurisdictions. They are usually mounted on the handlebars and thumb activated.

History
The bicycle bell was invented by John Richard Dedicoat, and patents for bicycle bells appear as early as 1877.

Types
The most common bells are actuated by a thumb-operated lever that is geared to rapidly rotate two loosely slung metal discs inside the bell housing. Said discs repeatedly rattle and strike the bell to produce a sound not unlike that of an electric bell. This type of bell  comes in left and right handed versions. Left handed versions are mounted on the left side of the handle bars and are used in countries that drive on the left hand side of the road. The right hand is then free to give traffic signals.

Simpler types also exist, with a spring-mounted external clapper that creates a "ding-ding" sound when the clapper is pulled with a finger and released.  Some bells, particularly these "ping" types, work poorly in rainy conditions because water drops clinging to the bell damp the vibrations which produce sound.

As musical instruments
Bicycle bells have also been used as musical instruments in such notable recordings as "You Still Believe in Me" on Pet Sounds by The Beach Boys and "Bicycle Race" by Queen and more.

See also
Bicycle horn

References

External links

Pictures and description of internal mechanism
Video clip of internal mechanism

Bells (percussion)
Bicycle parts